Han Pao-teh (19 August 1934 – 20 November 2014) was a Taiwanese architect, educator, scholar, writer, museum curator and calligrapher.

Han Pao-teh (Han Pao Teh) was born in Shandong, China and moved to Taiwan in 1949. He received his bachelor's degree in architecture from the Tainan Institute of Technology, now known as the National Cheng Kung University. He was awarded a full scholarship to attend Harvard University, where he received a master's degree in architecture in 1965. And in 1967, he received his second master's degree in Art History at Princeton University.

He was invited to return to Taiwan in 1967, and was appointed the Chair of the Department of Architecture at Tunghai University in Taichung, where he introduced a new system of education during his 10-year tenure. He was the Dean of the College of Science and Engineering at National Chung Hsing University from 1977 to 1981. In the late 70's he was credited to be the pioneer in the movement for the preservation of historic buildings in Taiwan . He personally researched and directed the restoration projects of many important historical landmarks, including Changhua Confucius Temple , Lukang Longshan Temple , and the Lin Family Mansion in Banqiao. Records and slides of his restoration projects including research and documentation are in the archives of the Department of Architecture at Tunghai University.

During 1981–1986, Han Pao-teh was appointed by the Executive Yuan to lead the preparation and design of National Museum of Natural Science in Taichung. This is the first museum of its kind in Taiwan. He was appointed by the Ministry of Education to be its first Director from 1986 to 1995. By 2021, this museum was the 18th most visited museums worldwide, even more visitors than the British Museum. In 1994, he was awarded the Education-Culture Medal, highest honor from the Education Ministry of the Executive Yuan.

In 1993, Han Pao-teh was appointed by the Ministry of Education to design, build and establish Tainan National University of the Arts (TNNUA). He served as the first president/chancellor of TNNUA 1996–2000, and elected program chair of the graduate school of Museum Studies in 1996. 

In 2000, after his retirement from TNNUA, Han Pao-teh was invited by the Ling Jiou Mountain Buddhist Foundation to be the first director and curator of the Museum of World Religions. 

During 1998–2001, he was also the director of National Culture and Arts Foundation. A prolific author and columnist, he published over 40 books. Majority of his hand written drafts can be found in the archives of the Taiwan National Central Library. 

He was also an accomplished Chinese Calligrapher, culminated in multiple personal exhibitions in museums and galleries in Taiwan, including two exhibitions at the National History Museum in 2005 and 2014.

Han Pao-teh was appointed presidential advisor, the Geheimrat of Presidential Office in Taiwan from 2001 until his death in 2014.

Han Pao-teh died in Taipei, Taiwan, on 20 November 2014. He was posthumously given the Executive Yuan National Cultural Award, the nation's highest honor for persons with great contribution to art and culture of Taiwan.

Han is commemorated in the scientific name of a species of Vietnamese lizard, Takydromus hani.

Works of architecture 

Representative works designed by Han Pao-teh include:
 Tiansiang Youth Activity Center (1978), Taroko Gorge, Hualien County
 Changhua Cultural Center (1981), Changhua County
 Institute of Ethnology (1985), Academia Sinica
 Tainan National University of the Arts (1996)
 Nan Yuan (South Garden) (1985) - Jiangnan-style architecture and landscaped gardens in Hsinpu, Hsinchu County, was for many years a very exclusive area for the use of top-echelon officers of the United Daily News (UDN).
 Kengting Youth Activity Center (1983), Kenting

Major publications 

 Han Pao-Teh, Han Pao-Teh's Narrative about Cultures, Artouch, 2006. .
 Han Pao-Teh, A Walk in European Architectures, Ecus Publishing House, 2005.
 Han Pao-Teh, The Memoir of Han Pao-Teh, Book Zoom, 2004. .
 Han Pao-Teh, Han Pao-Teh's Narrative about Aestheticism, Linkingbooks, 2004. .
 Han Pao-Teh, Expatiating on Architecture, Hebei Education Press, 2003. .
 Han Pao-Teh, Looking into Architecture, Artbook, 2002. .
 Han Pao-Teh, Exhibition Planning: Theory and Practice, Archi, 2000. .
 Han Pao-Teh, Recent Reflections on Architecture and Culture, National Museum of History, 1995. .
 Han Pao-Teh, The Story of Chinese Landscape Design: External Forms and Internal Visions, Art Media Resources, Ltd., 1992. .
 Han Pao-Teh, Museum Management, Garden City Publishers, 1990. .
 Han Pao-Teh, The Spiritual Dimensions of Architecture, Architecture Informations, 1971. .
 Han Pao-Teh, Architecture, Society and Culture, Architecture Informations, 1971. .

External links 

 

https://www.taipeitimes.com/News/feat/archives/2022/11/13/2003788814

https://taiwantoday.tw/news_amp.php?unit=18&post=24113

References 

1934 births
2014 deaths
Taiwanese architects
Academic staff of Tunghai University
Architectural theoreticians
Directors of museums in Taiwan
Harvard Graduate School of Design alumni
Princeton University alumni
Senior Advisors to President Ma Ying-jeou
Politicians from Rizhao
20th-century Taiwanese educators
Educators from Shandong
Republic of China politicians from Shandong
Taiwanese people from Shandong
Academic staff of the National Chung Hsing University
National Cheng Kung University alumni
Academic staff of Tainan National University of the Arts
Taiwanese university and college faculty deans